Haapsalu is a seaside resort town located on the west coast of Estonia. It is the administrative centre of Lääne County, and on 1 January 2020 it had a population of 9,375.

Description
Haapsalu has been well known for centuries for its warm seawater, curative mud and peaceful atmosphere. Salt mud spas frequented by the Russian Romanov family still operate. Narrow streets with early 20th century wooden houses lead to the sea. Haapsalu has been called the "Venice of the Baltics", although this claim has been criticized as an exaggeration. The name "Haapsalu" is from Estonian haab 'aspen' and salu 'grove.' In Swedish and German, the town is called Hapsal, and in Russian it is Га́псаль (Gapsal).

History

The town dates back to 1279, when it was chartered and became the centre of the Bishopric of Ösel-Wiek, which it remained for the next 300 years. Buildings from those early days remain today, including an episcopal castle which has the largest single-nave cathedral in the Baltic states, Haapsalu Castle.

Haapsalu and the surrounding area was the center for the Estonian Swedes from the 13th century until the evacuation of almost all ethnic Swedes from Estonia in 1944.

Neighborhoods of Haapsalu
There are six neighborhoods of Haapsalu:
Holmi
Kesklinn
Männiku
Paralepa
Randsalu
Vanalinn.

Healing spas
For many years, locals have claimed that the sea mud has a curative effect. A military doctor, Carl Abraham Hunnius, founded the first mud cure resort in 1825. News of the curative mud quickly reached the aristocracy of Saint Petersburg, the capital of the Russian Empire. Ever since then, Haapsalu has been a popular summer destination where people from all around the world come for medical treatment. Today, there are three mud cure establishments in Haapsalu varying in size and location.

Haapsalu shawl
In the 19th century, Haapsalu became famous for its shawls, a delicate craft made by local women.

Other attractions

The Land of Ilon Wikland (Wiklandia), a recreation centre for children, is set to open in a few years within the town. This world-famous book illustrator has been involved with Haapsalu since her childhood.

The August Blues Festival is held every August in Haapsalu.

Since 2005 the town hosts Haapsalu Horror and Fantasy Film Festival, an annual film festival dedicated to genre films. In 2017, the pastors of Haapsalu made an open statement calling to end the city's financing of the festival, claiming the horror and violence depicted in the screened films were not fit to represent the resort town image. The same year the festival was held to a record-breaking attendance.

In popular culture
Haapsalu is site of a fencing school founded by Estonian fencer Endel Nelis, used as the setting of the Finnish-Estonian film The Fencer.

Gallery

See also
Haapsalu shawl
Haapsalu linnastaadion
 August Blues Festival

References

External links

Haapsalu pictures and article

 
Cities and towns in Estonia
 
Populated coastal places in Estonia
Spa towns in Estonia
Populated places established in the 13th century
1279 establishments in Europe
13th-century establishments in Estonia
Kreis Wiek
Port cities and towns in Estonia